Pakistan Industrial Development Corporation (PIDC) is a state corporation of Pakistan working under Ministry of Industries and Production. It was established in 1952.

Subsidiary Companies

National Industrial Parks Development and Management Company
National Industrial Parks Development & Management Company (NIP) was created in 2006.

NIP is a public-private partnership established to develop focused industrial growth in Pakistan by developing world-class industrial parks all over the country.
The company was envisioned as a public-private hybrid. While it is a subsidiary of the PIDC, about 75% of its board members are from the private sector.

Technology Up-Gradation and Skill Development Company
Technology Up-Gradation & Skill Development Company (TUSDEC) has been incorporated in 2005 as a not for profit, guarantee limited company, a wholly owned subsidiary of Pakistan Industrial Development Corporation. 
Its functions include: 
 Promote and establish Technology Upgradation and Skill Development Centres by establishing common facility, design, support and maintenance, applied research and dissemination centres.
 To up-grade and transfer technology in targeted industrial sectors to enhance their productivity and competitiveness in the local as well as global sphere.

Karachi Tools, Dies And Moulds Centre
KTDMC was incorporated as a "non-profit" organisation in 2006 under the Government's Public Private Partnership program. KTDMC is being managed by an independent board of directors a majority of whom are techno-preneurs from the private sector.

KTDMC train professionals in field of designing, engineering and manufacturing of tools, dies and moulds through computer aided design and manufacturing Computer-aided design(CAD), Computer-aided manufacturing (CAM) and computer aided engineering (CAE).This is particularly important for the small and medium businesses which cannot otherwise afford large investments to set up such facilities for themselves.

Pakistan Stone Development Company
Pakistan Stone Development Company (PASDEC) is a public limited company functioning on not for profit as a subsidiary of Pakistan Industrial Development Corporation (Pvt.) Ltd. under the Ministry of Industries & Production. PASDEC is mandated for the development, promotion and up-gradation of dimensional Stone sector in Pakistan and promote value addition and develop domestic and international markets by introducing modern know-how and equipment.

Pakistan Gems and Jewellery Development Company

Pakistan Gems and Jewellery Development Company (PGJDC) is a subsidiary of Pakistan Industrial Development Corporation, Ministry of Industries & Production. The charter of the Company is to enhance the value chain productivity of gems and jewellery industry of Pakistan from Mine to Market. The Company aims to enhance exports through facilitation, technology up-gradation, skill development and marketing/branding initiatives.

Pakistan Hunting and Sporting Arms Development Company

Pakistan Hunting & Sporting Arms Development Company (PHSADC) is a sector development company, a subsidiary of Pakistan Industrial Development Corporation (PIDC), Ministry of Industries  &  Production for promoting Gunsmith sector in the country. 
PHSADC has undertaken the tasks of up-gradation and standardisation of locally produced hunting  &  sporting arms to internationally acceptable standards.

Furniture Pakistan Company

Furniture Pakistan Company is a subsidiary company of PFID established in 2007 to upgrade the furniture industry of Pakistan ultimately to enhance its export.

Southern Punjab Embroidery Industry
Southern Punjab Embroidery Industries is a joint venture project of private Sector and Pakistan Industrial Development Corporation. The company was established to promote and facilitate the continuous growth of the Hand & Machine made embroidery industry to enhance the export of such products. The company supports the Embroidery Sector at large in upgrading-skill, development/diversification of Hand and Machine made Embroidery products, technical advice etc.

Aik Hunar Aik Nagar

Aik Hunar Aik Nagar (AHAN) is operating as a not-for-profit Company since 2007. IT is a subsidiary of Pakistan Industrial Development Corporation (PIDC), under administrative control of Ministry of Industries & Production.

AHAN aim to generate non-traditional employment opportunities in rural areas by adopting and indigenising the One Village One Product (OVOP) concept of Japan and One Tambon One Product (OTOP) of Thailand. The primary objective is to alleviate poverty in rural and semi urban areas of Pakistan by supporting rural based micro and small enterprises engaged in the production of non-farm goods.

Pakistan Chemical And Energy Sector Skills Development
Pakistan Chemical and Energy Sector Skills Development Company (PCESSDC) was incorporated as a non-profit public-private partnership in 2009. The purpose of the company is to promote, facilitate and provide education and training to a young and growing rural population in various disciplines of the chemical and energy sector in Pakistan.
Its aim is to provide employment and invest in the productivity of locals for industrial development by establishing vocational education and training colleges (VETCs), technical training colleges (TTCs) and management schools.

Sind Engineering (PVT) Limited

See also
 Pakistan Small and Medium Enterprise Development Authority (SMEDA)
 Industry of Pakistan 
 Economy of Pakistan

References

External links
 
 Ministry of Industry

Government-owned companies of Pakistan
Financial services companies established in 1952
Industrial development agencies
Industry in Pakistan
Pakistan federal departments and agencies
Ministry of Industries and Production (Pakistan)